The 1991 Copa del Rey was the 55th edition of the Spanish basketball Cup. It was organized by the ACB and its Final Eight was played in Zaragoza, in the Pabellón Príncipe Felipe between 22 and 25 February 1991.

This edition was played by the 24 teams of the 1990–91 ACB season. The four first qualified teams of the previous season qualified directly to the Final Eight while teams 5 to 8 joined the competition in the third round.

First round
Teams #2 played the second leg at home.

|}

Second round

|}

Third round

|}

Final Eight Bracket

Final

MVP of the Tournament: Juan Antonio Orenga

External links
Boxscores at ACB.com
Linguasport

Copa del Rey de Baloncesto
1990–91 in Spanish basketball